Bunji-ye Saheli Latidan (also Romanized as Būnjī-ye Sāḩelī Lātīdān; also known as Bonji, Būnjī, and Būnjī-ye Sāḩelī) is a village in Kangan Rural District, in the Central District of Jask County, Hormozgan Province, Iran. At the 2006 census, its population was 105, in 19 families.

References 

Populated places in Jask County